The 1974 Texas Lutheran Bulldogs football team was an American football team that represented Texas Lutheran College (later renamed Texas Lutheran University) and won the national championship during the 1974 NAIA Division II football season. In their fourth season under head coach Jim Wacker, the Bulldogs compiled a perfect 11–0 record and outscored opponents by a total of 421 to 44. It was the first of two consecutive national championships for Texas Lutheran.

The team played its home games at Matador Stadium in Seguin, Texas.

Schedule

References

Texas Lutheran Bulldogs
Texas Lutheran Bulldogs football seasons
NAIA Football National Champions
College football undefeated seasons
Texas Lutheran Bulldogs football